Cardassian is a fictional extraterrestrial species in the American science fiction franchise Star Trek.

Cardassian(s) may also refer to: 
 "Cardassians" (DS9 episode) in Star Trek: Deep Space television series

See also 
 Kardashian, Armenian-derived surname